The Generalized System of Preferences, or GSP, is a preferential tariff system which provides tariff reduction on various products. The concept of GSP is very different from the concept of "most favored nation" (MFN). MFN status provides equal treatment in the case of tariff being imposed by a nation but in case of GSP differential tariff could be imposed by a nation on various countries depending upon factors such as whether it is a developed country or a developing country. Both the rules comes under the purview of WTO.

GSP provides tariff reduction for least developed countries but MFN is only for not discriminating among WTO members.

History

The idea of tariff preferences for developing countries was the subject of considerable discussion within the United Nations Conference on Trade and Development (UNCTAD) in the 1960s. Among other concerns, developing countries claimed that MFN was creating a disincentive for richer countries to reduce and eliminate tariffs and other trade restrictions with enough speed to benefit developing countries.

In 1971, the GATT followed the lead of UNCTAD and enacted two waivers to the MFN that permitted tariff preferences to be granted to developing country goods. Both these waivers were limited in time to ten years. In 1979, the GATT established a permanent exemption to the MFN obligation by way of the enabling clause. This exemption allowed contracting parties to the GATT (the equivalent of today's WTO members) to establish systems of trade preferences for other countries, with the caveat that these systems had to be "generalized, non-discriminatory and non-reciprocal' with respect to the countries they benefited (so-called "beneficiary" countries).  Countries were not supposed to set up GSP programs that benefited just a few of their "friends.'

Effects

From the perspective of developing countries as a group, GSP programs have been a mixed success. On one hand, most rich countries have complied with the obligation to generalize their programs by offering benefits to a large swath of beneficiaries, generally including nearly every non-OECD member state. Certainly, every GSP program imposes some restrictions. The United States, for instance, has excluded countries from GSP coverage for reasons such as being communist (Vietnam), being placed on the U.S. State Department's list of countries that support terrorism (Libya), and failing to respect U.S. intellectual property laws.

Criticism has been leveled noting that most GSP programs are not completely generalized with respect to products, and this is by design. That is, they don't cover products of greatest export interest to low-income developing countries lacking natural resources. In the United States and many other rich countries, domestic producers of "simple" manufactured goods, such as textiles, leather goods, ceramics, glass and steel, have long claimed that they could not compete with large quantities of imports. Thus, such products have been categorically excluded from GSP coverage under the U.S. and many other GSP programs. Critics assert that these excluded products are precisely the kinds of manufactures that most developing countries are able to export, the argument being that  developing countries may not be able to efficiently produce things like locomotives or telecommunications satellites, but they can make shirts.

Supporters note that even in the face of its limitations, it would not be accurate to conclude that GSP has failed to benefit developing countries, though some concede GSP has benefited developing countries unevenly. Some assert that, for most of its history, GSP has benefited "richer developing" countries - in early years Mexico, Taiwan, Hong Kong, Singapore, and Malaysia,  more recently Brazil and India - while providing virtually no assistance to the world's least developed countries, such as Haiti, Nepal, and most countries in sub-Saharan Africa.  The U.S., however, has closed some of these gaps through supplemental preference programs like the African Growth and Opportunity Act and a newer program for Haiti and Europe has done the same with Everything But Arms.

See also
Global System of Trade Preferences among Developing Countries (GSTP)

References

External links
 Information from UNCTAD about GSP programs in general.
 Information from UNCTAD on trends and utilization rates across reporting countries.
 Introduction to the U.S. GSP program by the U.S. Trade Representative.
 Information from the European Commission on the EU GSP arrangements.
 Introduction to Japan's GSP program by the Japanese Ministry of Foreign Affairs.

United States trade law
World Trade Organization